Orthochromis is a genus of relatively small haplochromine cichlids native to rivers and lakes in Eastern and Middle Africa. Most of its species are rheophilic.

As presently defined Orthochromis is polyphyletic. Some Orthochromis species were formerly included in Schwetzochromis.

Species
There are currently 14 recognized species in this genus:
 Orthochromis kalungwishiensis (Greenwood & Kullander, 1994)
 Orthochromis kasuluensis De Vos & Seegers, 1998
 Orthochromis luichensis De Vos & Seegers, 1998
 Orthochromis luongoensis (Greenwood & Kullander, 1994)
 Orthochromis machadoi (Poll, 1967) (Kunene Dwarf Happy)
 Orthochromis malagaraziensis (David, 1937)
 Orthochromis mazimeroensis De Vos & Seegers, 1998
 Orthochromis mosoensis De Vos & Seegers, 1998
 Orthochromis polyacanthus (Boulenger, 1899)
 Orthochromis rubrolabialis De Vos & Seegers, 1998
 Orthochromis rugufuensis De Vos & Seegers, 1998
 Orthochromis stormsi (Boulenger, 1902)
 Orthochromis torrenticola (Thys van den Audenaerde, 1963)
 Orthochromis uvinzae De Vos & Seegers, 1998

References
 C.Michael Hogan. 2012. Kunene River. eds. P.Saundry & C.Cleveland. Encyclopedia of Earth. National Council for Science and the Environment. Washington DC.

 
Haplochromini
Cichlid fish of Africa
Cichlid genera
Taxa named by Humphry Greenwood
Taxonomy articles created by Polbot